Frank Puletua (born 8 May 1978) is a former Samoa international rugby league footballer who played in the 1990s, 2000s and 2010s. A , he played his club football in the National Rugby League for Australian clubs the Penrith Panthers and the South Sydney Rabbitohs.

Background
Puletua played his junior rugby league for the St Mary's Saints before being signed by the Penrith Panthers.

His brother is New Zealand and Samoan international Tony Puletua. He holds fine arts and graphics design degrees from the University of Western Sydney

Playing career
Puletua made his NRL debut for the Penrith Panthers on 25 April 1998 against the Melbourne Storm. Eligible to represent Samoa, Puletua did so in the 2000 World Cup. He played for the Panthers until switching to the South Sydney Rabbitohs for the 2002 and 2003 seasons. He then signed with the new Gold Coast Titans but changed his mind and left the club, returning to Penrith. He was named in the Samoa training squad for the 2008 Rugby League World Cup.

Post-playing
After retiring from rugby league he became the creative producer at the Casula Powerhouse Arts Centre.
In September 2013 Puletua gave the 15th annual Tom Brock Lecture.

References

External links 

Frank Puletua at Panthers.com
Frank Puletua at NRL.com

1978 births
Living people
New Zealand rugby league players
New Zealand sportspeople of Samoan descent
Penrith Panthers players
Junior Kiwis players
Rugby league players from Auckland
Rugby league props
Rugby league second-rows
Samoa national rugby league team players
South Sydney Rabbitohs players
Windsor Wolves players